Prosopocera prasina is a species of beetle in the family Cerambycidae. It was described by Stephan von Breuning in 1936. It is known from the Democratic Republic of the Congo, Sierra Leone, and Cameroon.

References

Prosopocerini
Beetles described in 1936